The Archdeacon of Ross was the only archdeacon in the medieval Diocese of Ross, acting as a deputy of the Bishop of Ross. The following is a list of archdeacons:

List of archdeacons of Ross
 Robert, x 1223-1249 x 1250
 Robert de Fyvie, x 1269-1275
 John de Musselburgh, fl. 1279
 ?
 Alexander Stewart, x 1343-1350
 Thomas de Urquhart, x 1358-1365 x 1376
 Alexander Man, x 1376-1381
 Alexander de Waghorn, 1381 x 1398-1398
 David Seton, x 1399-1418 x 1422
 John de Inchmartin, 1409-1421 x 1422
 Andrew Munro, 1422-1451 x 1454
 Alexander Seton, fl. 1424 x 1430
 William Ross, 1451 x 1454-1455
 Richard Forbes, 1455-1460
 Patrick Vaus, 1460-1466
 Alexander Stewart, fl. 1472
 Gilbert MacDowell, x 1480
 Donald MacCulloch, fl. 1480
 David Lichton, 1483-1484
 Richard Muirhead, 1484-1488 x 1492
 John Scherar, fl. 1492-1506
 Robert Elphinstone, fl. 1510
 Mungo (Kentigern) Monypenny, fl. 1537-1545
 Donald Fraser, 1545 x 1546-1572 x 1573
 Robert Graham, 1573-1598 x 1602
 George Graham, 1602
 John MacKenzie, 1602-1636 x 1642

Notes

Bibliography
 Watt, D.E.R., Fasti Ecclesiae Scotinanae Medii Aevi ad annum 1638, 2nd Draft, (St Andrews, 1969), pp. 285–7

See also
 Bishop of Ross (Scotland)

Ross
History of the Scottish Highlands
People associated with Highland (council area)
Ross and Cromarty